The Model 610 is a six-shot, double-action revolver chambered for the 10mm Auto cartridge.

The 610 was manufactured by Smith & Wesson on the N-frame, similar to the Smith & Wesson Model 29 in .44 Magnum, and the Model 27/28 in .357 Magnum. The 10mm Auto is a rimless automatic pistol cartridge, so moon clips are used to hold cartridges when loading and extracting spent cases en bloc. The Model 610 can also chamber and fire .40 S&W rounds, as the .40 S&W cartridge is a shorter, less powerful variant of the 10mm Auto with the same diameter.

History
The Model 610 debuted in 1990, but shortly after its introduction, popularity of the 10mm round was declining and slow sales caused Smith & Wesson to retire the model in 1992.

After a six-year hiatus, it was reintroduced in 1998 for competitive shooting matches with a few changes. The firing pin was moved from the hammer to inside the frame and an internal safety lock was added. This reintroduction was at the behest of members of the International Practical Shooting Confederation, although the Model 610 is more commonly used in International Defensive Pistol Association matches.

Like the 1998 version, the 2019 models have a six-round capacity, stainless steel for all major parts, and Smith and Wesson's safety-lock system. The 2019 version comes standard with black synthetic finger groove grips, a black blade interchangeable front sight, and an adjustable white outline rear sight. The 610 is capable of firing both 10mm and .40 S&W cartridges, using moon clips that come standard with the revolver.

References

Smith & Wesson revolvers
10mm Auto firearms
.40 S&W firearms